Potential Ebola drugs include:
 Ebola virus disease treatment research (non-vaccine treatments under development)
 Ebola vaccines under development